D413 branches off to the north from D425 in Ploče towards Port of Ploče - providing ferry access to Trpanj on Pelješac peninsula.

The road, as well as all other state roads in Croatia, is managed and maintained by Hrvatske ceste, a state owned company.

Traffic volume 

Traffic is regularly counted on the road by Hrvatske ceste. Substantial variations between annual (AADT) and summer (ASDT) traffic volumes are attributed to the fact that the road connects to a number of summer resorts.

Road junctions and populated areas

Sources

State roads in Croatia
Transport in Dubrovnik-Neretva County